Antonia de Sancha (born 14 September 1961 in Hammersmith, London) is an English actress and businesswoman best known as the former mistress of British Conservative Member of Parliament and Cabinet minister David Mellor which became public knowledge in 1992.

She is the daughter of a Spanish film producer father, who died in the mid-1980s,<ref>Neil Tweedle & Tom Rowley "Whatever happened to Antonia de Sancha - the kiss-and-tell lover who brought down David Mellor?", telegraph.co.uk 1 February 2013. The Telegraph piece says 1985, the Irish Independent 1984.</ref> and a Swedish mother who, suffering from severe depression, committed suicide 18 months later, shortly before her daughter began studies at the Royal Academy of Dramatic Art. At the time of the revelations of her affair, de Sancha was described by some news outlets as a "soft-porn actress" because she had played the part of a prostitute in a film in which she had simulated sex. The affair with Mellor was a contributory factor in his subsequent resignation from the cabinet on 24 September 1992.

Believing her acting career was ruined and aware that newspapers were making money out of the story and she was not, de Sancha hired publicist Max Clifford to sell her story to various newspapers. She made about £30,000 from those sales.

The furore that followed publication left her deeply unhappy. "It was emotional rape", de Sancha told an interviewer ten years after the scandal referring to the bugging of her flat which led to the affair being made public. She had scarcely any work as an actress since the scandal, and considered the scandal as the reason a subsequent marriage failed.

She was the subject of an instalment of the Discovery Channel documentary series The Mistress'' in 2002. De Sancha now runs an Indian textiles importing business in Portobello Road, Kensington, west London.

See also
Back to Basics (campaign)

References

External links 

1961 births
Living people
English film actresses
Alumni of RADA
Actresses from London
People from Hammersmith
English people of Swedish descent
English people of Spanish descent